Krananda lucidaria is a geometer moth in the subfamily Ennominae first described by John Henry Leech in 1897. It is found in Western and Southern China, Northern Thailand, Peninsular Malaysia, Sumatra, and Borneo in lower montane forests.

References

External links

Boarmiini
Ennominae
Moths of Borneo
Moths of Malaysia
Moths of Asia
Moths described in 1897